African Skies/Cieux Africains is published by the Working Group on Space Sciences in Africa. It is distributed to individuals and institutes involved in research and education in the space sciences in Africa. The editor-in-chief is P. Martinez (South African Astronomical Observatory).

External links 
 

Open access journals
Space science journals
Academic journals published by learned and professional societies
Multilingual journals
Annual journals
Publications established in 1997